Jeremiah P. Riordan (February 17, 1873 – January 20, 1936) was an American football player and coach.

Riordan was born in Trenton, Wisconsin and attended school in West Bend. Riordan was the third head football at Marquette University and he held that position for two seasons, in 1901 and 1903.

Riordan died of an "attack of heart disease" at St. Paul, Minnesota in 1936. He was buried at Madison, Wisconsin.

Head coaching record

References

External links
 

1873 births
1936 deaths
19th-century players of American football
American football guards
Marquette Golden Avalanche football coaches
Wisconsin Badgers football coaches
Wisconsin Badgers football players
People from Washington County, Wisconsin